The Cowthorpe Oak was an oak tree in Cowthorpe, North Yorkshire, England.  Renowned for its age and size it was sketched by the artist J. M. W. Turner.  At its greatest extent its canopy was said to cover  of land.  The tree declined in the late 18th century and lost several of its leading branches.  By 1822 many of its branches were almost completely rotten and it had been supported with wooden props.  The tree fell in 1950, apparently after having been struck by lightning.

History 

The oak has been said to date to the era of the Norman Conquest or even early Roman times.  It was already ancient when Alexander Hunter, in his 1776 edition of John Evelyn's Sylva, wrote of it, "The dimensions are almost incredible... The foliage is extremely thin, so that the anatomy of the ancient branches may be distinctly seen in the height of summer. When compared to this, all other trees are but children of the forest".  Cowthorpe's St Michael's Church was constructed nearby and a public house was named Ye Old Oak Inn after the tree.  At its greatest extent its canopy was said to cover  of land.  In the early 19th century the tree was owned by Charles Stourton, 17th Baron Stourton and then The Honorable Mr Petre.  The tree was sketched by J. M. W. Turner.

Decline and death 
It is said to have decayed greatly between 1773 and 1804; in 1794 another leading branch fell, causing alarm to nearby residents. The hollow trunk was said to be large enough to hold 70 people, if children were carried on the adults' shoulders.

The Cowthorpe oak was photographed in 1904 and appeared to be in good health, though it was heavily propped.  The tree died in 1950, apparently having been struck by lightning.  At this time it was said to be England's oldest tree.  The remains of the tree were removed by Ian Watson as it had become unsafe.

The tree's lineage survives as several of its acorns were sent to New Zealand to be planted there. The Runciman Oak also has many descendants, planted in an avenue nearby.

See also
 List of Great British Trees

References 

Individual trees in England
Individual oak trees
1950s individual tree deaths